The Adelidae or fairy longhorn moths are a family of monotrysian moths in the lepidopteran infraorder Heteroneura. The family was first described by Charles Théophile Bruand d'Uzelle in 1851. Most species have at least partially metallic patterns coloration and are diurnal, sometimes swarming around the tips of branches with an undulating flight. Others are crepuscular and have a drab coloration. Fairy longhorn moths have a wingspan of 4–28 millimeters, and males often have especially long antennae, 1–3 times as long as the forewing.

They are widespread around the world and can be found over much of North America and Eurasia from April to June. About 50 species occur in Europe, of which most widely noted is the green longhorn (Adela reaumurella) which can sometimes reach great abundance; due to climate change its peak flying season is shifting towards spring. In general, they are more plentiful in the Northern Hemisphere, but the family occurs in the Neotropics, sub-Saharan Africa, South-East Asia and Australia too.

Adelidae are usually closely restricted to particular host plants, in which the females insert their eggs or just lay among leaf litter, and the caterpillars make a case, completing their development on the ground. Fairy longhorn moths feed in sunshine on nectar from the flowers of herbaceous (woody) plants.

Systematics
Fairy longhorn moths belong to the superfamily Adeloidea, one of the basal ("monotrysian") branches of the advanced moth infraorder Heteroneura. By lepidopteran standards, they are thus still rather primitive micromoths. But like other Heteroneura, they already possess the apomorphic sucking proboscis – usually considered a defining feature of Lepidoptera, but the most ancestral moths still live on solid food which they chew.

The Adelidae were previously placed as the subfamily Adelinae within the family Incurvariidae.

Subfamilies

The Adelidae are usually divided into two subfamilies, but most genera are of uncertain or basal relationships. Selected species are also listed:

Subfamily Adelinae
 Adela Latreille, 1796
 Adela croesella
 Adela reaumurella – green longhorn
 Cauchas Zeller, 1839
 Cauchas rufimitrella
 Nemophora Illiger & Hoffmannsegg, 1798 (tentatively placed here)
Nemophora degeerella – longhorn moth
 Nemophora metallica
 Nemophora ochsenheimerella
Subfamily Nematopogoninae
 Ceromitia Zeller, 1852 (tentatively placed here)
 Ceromitia iolampra
 Nematopogon
Incertae sedis
 Subclemensia
 Trichofrons

The genus Tridentaforma is sometimes placed among the Adelidae incertae sedis too; others assign it to the closely related Prodoxidae.

Footnotes

References
 Davis, D. R. (1999): The Monotrysian Heteroneura. In: Kristensen, N. P. (ed.): Handbuch der Zoologie/Handbook of Zoology (Volume IV – Arthropoda: Insecta. Part 35: Lepidoptera, Moths and Butterflies 1): 65–90. Walter de Gruyter, Berlin & New York. 
 Edwards, E. D. (2007): Australian Faunal Directory – Adelidae. Version of 28 June 2007. Retrieved 9 May 2010.
 Fauna Europaea (FE) (2009): Adelidae. Version 2.1, 22 December 2009. Retrieved 3 May 2010.
 Kuchlein, J. H. & Ellis, W. N. (2004): Climate-induced changes in the microlepidoptera fauna of the Netherlands and the implications for nature conservation. Journal of Insect Conservation 1(2): 73–80.  PDF fulltext

External links

 UK Adelidae key
 
 

 
Moth families